The 2002 NRL season was the 95th season of professional rugby league football in Australia and the fifth to be run by the National Rugby League. The season was affected by the competition-leading Canterbury-Bankstown Bulldogs' salary cap breach finding, which saw them relegated to the bottom of the NRL ladder. As a result, the New Zealand Warriors won their first minor premiership and made it to the grand final for the first time, playing against foundation club the Sydney Roosters who won the match and collected their first premiership in 27 years.

Pre-season
In February 2002 the National Rugby League's Director of Legal and Business Affairs, David Gallop, was appointed Chief Executive Officer of the NRL, succeeding David Moffett.

The legendary Broncos and Maroons halfback, Allan Langer, returned from England to play his final season of professional football with the Brisbane club. In doing so he became the NRL's oldest player for the 2002 season at 36 years and 60 days.

The return of South Sydney

Following the club's departure from the NRL after the 1999 season, there was a continuing push from both fans and the wider rugby league community to reinstate the South Sydney Rabbitohs into the NRL competition. After two unsuccessful years of lobbying, South Sydney finally received a court ruling in their favour in 2001. On 15 March 2002, the South Sydney club opened the NRL season with a home match against long-time rivals, the Sydney Roosters, losing badly, 40-6.

It turned out to be a tough year for South Sydney, winning only five matches from 24 played.

Teams
The number of teams contesting the Premiership increased for the 2002 season from 14 to 15 due to the re-inclusion of the South Sydney Rabbitohs. It was the first time the number of Premiership teams had increased since the 1995 ARL season when the introduction of the Auckland Warriors, North Queensland Cowboys, South Queensland Crushers and Western Reds saw the number of teams increase from 16 to 20.

Regular season
In 2002, as in 2001, the NRL's advertising was handled by Saatchi & Saatchi Sydney. As in the previous season, there was no big budget season launch advertising campaign. The NRL focussed on stretching its marketing spending throughout the season with newspaper ads promoting individual rounds and clubs, and with simple TV ads to promote key games.

The Bulldogs won 17 games in a row and had an unbeaten run of 18 games, the most in the club's history. However they were deducted 37 premiership points for a gross salary cap breaches, the most points deducted in premiership history. That left the club with just four competition points attained from the two byes earlier in the season. Four more competition points followed since the salary cap scandal, all from wins in the last two rounds of the season.

The New Zealand Warriors won the club's first Minor Premiership in its 8-year history and also made it to their first Grand Final. The Warriors were not in first place almost during the entire season, only taking top spot on the ladder at the conclusion of Round 26.

John Hopoate ran 3,976 metres with the ball in 2002, more than any other player in the competition.

At the end of the season NRL referees' coach Peter Louis resigned from his position.

Bulldogs salary cap breach

In mid-2002, the Canterbury club were found guilty of serious and systemic breaches of the salary cap. NRL Chief Executive David Gallop described the violation as "exceptional in both its size and its deliberate and ongoing nature". The club received a $500,000 fine, and was stripped of 37 of its 41 competition points accumulated up to Round 23. The latter action was particularly harmful, as the club were poised to take the Minor Premiership and had won 17 consecutive matches (the second highest in Australian club rugby league history at the time). The deduction of the 37 competition points meant that the Canterbury side would win the wooden spoon, as the South Sydney Rabbitohs had already accumulated 12 competition points by the end of Round 24.

The deduction of Canterbury's points also enabled the Canberra Raiders to make the finals with a points differential of -170, the poorest such record of any finalist in the competition's history, and the Raiders only won one game outside of Canberra for the entire season. It also enabled the New Zealand Warriors to secure their first minor premiership in the club's history.

Bold – Home game
X – Bye
Opponent for round listed above margin

Ladder
The Warriors received A$100,000 prize money for finishing the regular season as minor premiers.

Finals series
To decide the grand finalists from the top eight finishing teams, the NRL adopts the McIntyre final eight system.

Coincidentally, the finalists for 2002 were almost the same as the previous season, with the exception of the Bulldogs being replaced by Canberra. Had the Bulldogs not been deducted competition points, they would have become the minor premiers and completed the replication, with Canberra moving down to 9th.

Chart
{{8McIntyre 
| RD1-team1= New Zealand
| RD1-score1=36
| RD1-team8= Cronulla
| RD1-score8=20

| RD1-team2= Canberra
| RD1-score2=20
| RD1-team7= Sydney
| RD1-score7=32''

| RD1-team3= Newcastle
| RD1-score3=22| RD1-team6= Parramatta
| RD1-score6=14

| RD1-team4= St. George Illawarra| RD1-score4=26| RD1-team5= Brisbane| RD1-score5=24

| RD2-team1= St. George Illawarra
| RD2-score1=24
| RD2-team2= Cronulla| RD2-score2=40| RD2-team3= Sydney| RD2-score3=38| RD2-team4= Newcastle
| RD2-score4=12

| RD3-team1= New Zealand| RD3-score1=16| RD3-seed2=
| RD3-team2= Cronulla
| RD3-score2=10
| RD3-team3= Brisbane
| RD3-score3=12
| RD3-seed4=
| RD3-team4= Sydney| RD3-score4=16| RD4-seed1=
| RD4-team1= New Zealand
| RD4-score1=8
| RD4-seed2=
| RD4-team2= Sydney| RD4-score2=30}}

Grand Final

The 2002 NRL Grand Final was the conclusive and premiership-deciding game of the 2002 NRL season. It took place on Sunday, 6 October 2002, at Sydney's Telstra Stadium. 80,130 people saw the Sydney Roosters beat the New Zealand Warriors 30–8. The Clive Churchill Medalist was Craig Fitzgibbon of the Sydney Roosters. The match was also broadcast live in the United States by Fox Sports World.

Player statistics
The following statistics are as of the conclusion of Round 26.Top 5 point scorersTop 5 try scorersTop 5 goal scorers'''

2002 Transfers

Players

Coaches

References

Further reading

External links
 NRL official website
 RLeague.com 2002 NRL Draw and Results
 Blood, guts and Rooster glory - Sydney Morning Herald match report
2002 NRL Grand Final at sportsphotography.net